SITE Santa Fe (often referred to simply as SITE) is a nonprofit contemporary arts organization based in Santa Fe, New Mexico. Since its founding in 1995, SITE Santa Fe has presented 11 biennials, more than 90 contemporary art exhibitions, and works by more than 800 artists. Following its presentation of the first international biennial of contemporary art in the U.S., SITE expanded its programming to include ongoing exhibitions of notable artists in solo and group shows, often including new commissions and U.S. debuts. While SITE presents artists from all over the world, it has also provided support and career development opportunities for local New Mexico talent. Approximately 20% of the exhibited artists are based in New Mexico.

SITE also presents public and educational programs relevant to the themes of each exhibition. This includes conversations with artists and curators, film screenings, performances, concerts, hands-on workshops, and collaborations with Santa Fe Public Schools. SITE partners with local organizations and schools to develop and present its programs.

History 
In 1992, local gallery owner Laura Carpenter conceived the idea of SITE Santa Fe, soliciting donations that would eventually total more than $1 million.  A third of the collected funds went into the renovation of a railside warehouse into 19,000 feet of exhibition space by New York architect Richard Gluckman.

SITE Santa Fe, curated by Bruce W. Ferguson, was started in 1995 with the goal of hosting the only biennial of contemporary art in the entire United States. For the biennial's first edition, Ferguson and co-curator Vince Varga selected 31 artists, from 13 different countries to participate.

The first of these biennials was launched on July 14, 1995, and ran through October 8, 1995. Over the years, SITE's International Biennial has featured guest curators including Bruce W. Ferguson (1995), Francesco Bonami (1997), Rosa Martinez (1999), Dave Kickey (2001), Robert Storr (2004), Klaus Ottomann (2006), Lance Fung (2008), and Daniel Belasco and Sarah Lewis (2010). Following the success of the first biennial, SITE Santa Fe opted to present exhibitions on an ongoing basis, including works by Felix Gonzalez-Torres, Jenny Holzer, Rebecca Horn, Anish Kapoor, Bruce Nauman, Lorna Simpson, Andres Serrano, Gregory Crewdson, Andy Goldsworthy, Takashi Murakami, Elizabeth Peyton, Raymond Pettibon, and Kara Walker.

SITE Santa Fe also administers grants to local artists and holds ancillary programs in education and development.

In 1997, SITE Santa Fe served as commissioning institution for the United States pavilion at the Venice Biennale.

The seventh biennial, Lucky Number Seven, opened on Lucky Number Seven, opened June 22, 2008. The exhibit, curated by Lance Fung, featured the work of 25 artists from 16 different countries. The exhibition was documented online by a student documentary team from the Media Arts Program at New Mexico Highlands University, the New Media Arts Program at the Institute of American Indian Arts, and other local arts programs. Many community members collaborate with SITE Santa Fe, such as Deborah Fritz, a local curator and gallerist.

In 2011, SITE's leadership set out to reimagine its signature biennial exhibition. SITElines: New Perspectives on Art of the Americas, the first of the reimagined biennials, was organized by a diverse team of curators and featured artworks that explore the many layers of history and culture in the Western hemisphere, highlighting under-recognized points of view. Simultaneously, SITE developed SITE Center, a socially engaged artist residency program that ties the curatorial process of SITElines and outreach programs that foster deeper engagement within New Mexico communities. SITE Center residencies have addressed topics such as cultural differences, Indigenous histories, and incarceration.

In the summer of 2016, SITE broke ground on an expansion and renovation project designed by Shop Architects. After a year of construction, SITE reopened with a new building that increased the museum's capacity to display artwork, host events, and engage with local students.

Current activity 
SITE Santa Fe was closed temporarily for the protection of staff and visitors during the COVID-19 pandemic. SITE reopened to visitors with Displaced: Contemporary Artists Confront the Global Refugee Crisis in July 2020.

Notes

External links 

1995 establishments in New Mexico
Art galleries established in 1995
Art museums and galleries in New Mexico
Arts organizations based in the United States
Contemporary art galleries in the United States
Modern art museums in the United States
Museums in Santa Fe, New Mexico
Non-profit organizations based in New Mexico